This is a list of aviation schools in Uganda

 East African Civil Aviation Academy: Soroti: 1971
 Uganda Aviation School: Kampala: 2011
 Moriah Aviation Training Centre: Abayita Ababiri: 2015
 Pangea Aviation Academy: Kajjansi: 1997
 Kampala Aeroclub and Flight Training Centre (KAFTC): Kajjansi: 2009. 
 Aero Consultants East Africa Limited (ACEAL): Entebbe
 Vine Air Flight Academy (VAFA): Jinja
 Kubis Aviation College (KAC): Kampala
 BAR Aviation Uganda: Kajjansi and Entebbe: 2008
 Ocean Heights Aviation Training Center: Katabi, Entebbe

See also
Uganda Civil Aviation Authority
List of airports in Uganda
List of airlines of Uganda
Transport in Uganda

References

External links
 How To Pursue A Career In Aviation As of 23 November 2009.

 
Aviation schools
Transport in Uganda